Nityananda Palit, known as Nitai Palit (8 March 1923 – 26 July 1990) was a playwright, actor and director. In 1965, he received the President's Award from Indira Gandhi for direction in his film Malajahna. This was the first Oriya film ever to be awarded the 'Silver Lotus' for direction and is still considered a classic.

Filmography 
Malajahna (1965)

References 

20th-century Indian male actors
People from Cuttack
Odia film directors
1923 births
1990 deaths
Male actors from Odisha
Film directors from Odisha